Karasi Bey (? –1330),, was the second Bey of the Karasids in north-west Anatolia, in modern Balıkesir Province, Turkey, succeeding Kalam Bey in 1303. He died in 1330 in Karasi. Karasi Bey generally enjoyed good relations with both the Byzantines and the Ottomans.

References 

13th-century births
1330 deaths
Anatolian beyliks